Allostery is the most direct and efficient way for regulation of biological macromolecule function induced by the binding of a ligand at an allosteric site topographically distinct from the orthosteric site. Due to the inherent high receptor selectivity and lower target-based toxicity, it is also expected to play a more positive role in drug discovery and bioengineering, leading to rapid growth on allosteric findings.

Allosteric Database (ASD) provides a central resource for the display, search and analysis of the structure, function and related annotation for allosteric molecules. Currently, ASD contains allosteric proteins from more than 100 species and modulators in three categories (activators, inhibitors, and regulators). Each protein is annotated with a detailed description of allostery, biological process and related diseases, and each modulator with binding affinity, physicochemical properties and therapeutic area. Integrating the information of allosteric proteins in ASD should allow for the prediction of allostery for unknown proteins and eventually make them ideal targets for experimental validation. In addition, modulators curated in ASD can be used to investigate potent allosteric targets for the query compound, and also help chemists implement structure modifications for novel allosteric drug designs. Therefore, ASD could be a platform and a starting point for biologists and medicinal chemists for furthering allosteric research.

References

External links
Website

Biological databases
Protein classification
Enzyme kinetics